Robert Benjamin 'Bobby' Schwartz (born August 10, 1956) is an American professional speedway rider. He became World Pairs Champion with Bruce Penhall in 1981 and Dennis Sigalos in 1982.

Career
Born in Santa Barbara, California, Schwartz was introduced to speedway by the boss of his local bike shop, ex-rider Sonny Nutter. His father bought him a Jawa motorcycle for his 17th birthday and he was soon progressing around the Irwindale Raceway in California. It took a few years before he was persuaded to come to England though, despite many approaches. He came with a sparkling reputation as one of America's brightest young stars, and that was enhanced by the recommendation by none other than Bruce Penhall. When he finally came to ride in England for Cradley Heath after already reaching the Inter-continental final in the UK, Schwartz progressed from novice British league reserve to an out and out heatleader who was regularly competing with and beating the very best. It was all no surprise though, after he scorched to 11 points from 4 rides in his Dudley Wood debut meeting. There followed a fantastic partnership with his friend, Penhall, as the two knew each other's track style almost as well as they knew their own. They Won the 1981 World pairs title together and Bobby repeated this with a different partner, Dennis Sigalos in 1982. He also won the World team Cup with the US in 1982. He was US team Captain from 1983 to 1987 and US National Champion in 1986 and 1989.

Bobby 'Boogaloo' Schwartz continues to ride in the US to this day. He has regularly competes on the tiny Californian circuits.

World Final appearances

World Pairs Championship
 1981 -  Chorzów, Silesian Stadium (with Bruce Penhall) – Winner – 23pts (9)
 1982 -  Sydney, Liverpool City Raceway (with Dennis Sigalos) – Winner – 30pts (12)
 1983 -  Göteborg, Ullevi (with Dennis Sigalos) – 4th – 18pts (8)
 1984 -  Lonigo, Pista Speedway (with Shawn Moran) – 4th – 19pts (11)
 1985 -  Rybnik, Rybnik Municipal Stadium (with Shawn Moran) – 3rd – 22pts (11)

World Team Cup
 1980 -  Wrocław, Olympic Stadium (with Bruce Penhall / Scott Autrey / Dennis Sigalos / Ron Preston) – 2nd – 29pts (3)
 1982 -  London, White City (with Bruce Penhall / Kelly Moran / Shawn Moran / Scott Autrey) – Winner – 37pts (9)
 1983 -  Vojens, Speedway Center (with Dennis Sigalos / Lance King / Kelly Moran) – 3rd – 27pts (6)
 1984 -  Leszno, Alfred Smoczyk Stadium (with Shawn Moran / Kelly Moran / Lance King / John Cook) – 3rd – 20pts (2)
 1985 -  Long Beach, Veterans Memorial Stadium (with Shawn Moran / John Cook / Lance King / Sam Ermolenko) – 2nd – 35pts (11)
 1986 -  Göteborg, Ullevi,  Vojens, Speedway Center,  Bradford, Odsal Stadium (with Shawn Moran / Sam Ermolenko / Lance King / Rick Miller)  - 2nd - 76pts (5)

References 

1956 births
Living people
Sportspeople from Santa Barbara, California
American speedway riders
Cradley Heathens riders
King's Lynn Stars riders
Reading Racers riders
Eastbourne Eagles riders